Roydon Hamlet is a hamlet in the Epping Forest district in the English county of Essex. Nearby settlements include the large town of Harlow and the village of Roydon, some three miles away.

References 

Hamlets in Essex
Roydon, Essex